Alphasida holosericea is a beetle of the darkling beetles family.

Distribution 
Its area of distribution seems to be limited to Málaga and the surrounding area.

References 

 

Tenebrionidae
Animals described in 1824